Margarites crebrilirulata is a species of sea snail, a marine gastropod mollusk in the family Margaritidae.

Description

Distribution
This species occurs in Antarctic waters.

References

 Smithsonian Museum of Natural History: Margarites crebrilirulata
 Engl W. (2012) Shells of Antarctica. Hackenheim: Conchbooks. 402 pp

crebrilirulata
Gastropods described in 1907